Jonathan W. Brown (born November 28, 1968 in New York City) is an American rower. He finished 5th in the men's eight at the 1996 Summer Olympics. Jon Brown rowed at Boston University. He also won two bronze medals (1993, 1995) and one Gold (1994) in the HW8 at Worlds. Vanity Fair Cover 1996 Olympics photo shoot by Annie Leibowitz with other Olympic athletes.  

Education: Boston University, Bachelor of Arts (BA), John Jay College (CUNY), Master's degree

References

External links
 
 
 

1968 births
Living people
Sportspeople from New York City
Rowers at the 1996 Summer Olympics
Olympic rowers of the United States
World Rowing Championships medalists for the United States
American male rowers
Pan American Games medalists in rowing
Pan American Games gold medalists for the United States
Pan American Games silver medalists for the United States
Rowers at the 1995 Pan American Games
Rowers at the 1999 Pan American Games
Medalists at the 1995 Pan American Games